York Suburban may refer to:
 York Suburban School District
 York Suburban Senior High School